

This is a list of the National Natural Landmarks (NNLs) in West Virginia. There are sixteen in all — five are wetlands (such as bogs and swamps), three are forests, six are limestone caves/karst, and two are rock formations. All are located entirely within West Virginia with the exception of the Cranesville Swamp Nature Sanctuary, which lies mostly within Garrett County, Maryland but also extends into Preston County, West Virginia. Eleven of the sixteen NNLs are within the boundaries of the Monongahela National Forest, although this does not necessarily mean they are on public land.

De-designation
According to a notice in the Federal Register in July 2006, Swago Karst Area in Pocahontas County was removed by the Department of the Interior from NNL designation in response to owner requests. It was originally designated in November 1973. Its description formerly read: "A classic illustration of features associated with karst topography and terrain, including caverns and other passages."

See also
List of National Natural Landmarks
List of National Historic Landmarks in West Virginia
National Register of Historic Places listings in West Virginia

References

External links
 National Park Service: West Virginia National Natural Landmarks

West Virginia
National Natural Landmarks